John Ales (born January 3, 1969) is an American actor best known for appearing in Spy Hard, The Nutty Professor, You Wish, and other films and television series.

Filmography

Film
Crime Killer (1985) ... Kids
Spy Hard (1996) ... Kabul
The Nutty Professor (1996) ... Jason
Vibrations (1996) ... Miles
Ride with the Devil (1999) ... William Quantrill
Nutty Professor II: The Klumps (2000) ... Jason
 Burning Down the House (2001)
The Zeroes (2001) ... Seth
Life of the Party (2001) ... Artie
Uprising (2001) ...Marek Edelman
Living with Lou (2004) ... Lou
D-War (2007) ... Agent Judah Campbell
Lucky Man (2007)
Murder at Emigrant Gulch (2021)
Gatlopp: Hell of a Game (2022) ... Andre
9 Bullets ... Rabbi Steins

Television
Madman of the People (1994) ... Dylan Buckler
You Wish (1997–1998) ... Genie
Fantasy Island (1998) ... Nathan O'Neil
Chicago Hope (1999) ... File Thief
The Wild Thornberrys (2000) ... Hartebeast, Honey Badger #2
The Fugitive (2001) ... Dr. Felice
Boomtown (2003) ... Shackman
Second Time Around (2004) ... Kent Simon
CSI: Miami (2004) ... Mike Tibbetts
Center of the Universe  (2005) ... Lex
Without a Trace (2005) ... George Zousmer
Mud Show (2006) ... Mookie
Vanished (2006) ... Zach
In Plain Sight (2008) ... Jay Allen
CSI: Crime Scene Investigation (2009) ... Timothy Rand
Medium (2009) ... Hal Munzell
 Major Crimes: Final Cut  (2013)...Martin Elliot
Sex & Drugs & Rock & Roll (2015-2016) ... Rehab
Bosch (2017) ... Andrew Holland
Better Things (2017) ... Rodney
Sneaky Pete (2018) ... Luka Delchev
The Act (2019) ... Vance Godejohn
Euphoria (2019) ... David Vaughn
Runaways (2019) ... Quinton The Great
Star Trek: Picard (2020) ... Bruce Maddox
MacGyver (2020) ... Nikola Tesla
Day by Day as Narrator (voice)
 Station 19 (2021) as Brother John
 True Story (2021)... Nikos

References

External links

1969 births
American male film actors
American male television actors
Living people
Male actors from Los Angeles